Zuliana de Aviación C.A. was a Venezuelan airline. It initially began as a cargo airline in 1985 based in Maracaibo, but later began service as a passenger carrier. Its name was derived from the Venezuelan state of Zulia. The airline ceased operations in April 1997.

Destinations

Bogotá (El Dorado International Airport)
Medellín (José María Córdova International Airport)

 Miami (Miami International Airport)

Barcelona (General José Antonio Anzoátegui International Airport)
Caracas (Simón Bolívar International Airport)
Las Piedras (Josefa Camejo International Airport)
Maracaibo (La Chinita International Airport) Hub
Porlamar (Santiago Mariño Caribbean International Airport)
Puerto Ordaz (Manuel Carlos Piar Guayana Airport)
San Antonio del Táchira (Juan Vicente Gómez International Airport)
Santa Barbara del Zulia (Miguel Urdaneta Fernández Airport)
Valencia (Arturo Michelena International Airport)

Fleet
Zuliana de Aviación had formerly operated the following aircraft:

5 Boeing 727-200
1 Douglas DC-8-51F
2 Douglas DC-8-54CF
2 McDonnell Douglas DC-9-31
3 McDonnell Douglas DC-9-32

See also
List of defunct airlines of Venezuela

References

External links

Defunct airlines of Venezuela
Venezuelan companies established in 1985
Airlines established in 1985
Airlines disestablished in 1997